Kåre or Kaare is a given name. Notable people with the name include:

People

Kåre
Kåre Øistein Hansen (1927–2012), Norwegian politician (SV)
Kåre Øvregard (born 1933), Norwegian politician for the Labour Party
Kåre And The Cavemen, Norwegian rock band formed 1990, disbanded 2000
Kåre Berg (1932–2009), Norwegian MD, professor in medical genetics, physician-in-chief and researcher
Kåre Berven Fjeldsaa (1918–1991), Norwegian ceramic designer
Kåre Bluitgen (born 1959), Danish writer and journalist
Kåre Christiansen (1911–1964), Norwegian bobsledder
Kåre Dæhlen (1926–2020), Norwegian diplomat
Kåre Fostervold (born 1969), Norwegian politician for the Progress Party
Kåre Gjønnes (1942–2021), Norwegian politician for the Christian People's Party
Kåre Grøndahl Hagem (1915–2008), Norwegian politician for the Conservative Party
Kåre Harila (born 1935), Norwegian politician for the Christian Democratic Party
Kåre Hedebrant (born 1995), Swedish child actor
Kåre Holt (1916–1997), Norwegian author
Kåre Hovda (1944–1999), Norwegian biathlete
Kåre Ingebrigtsen (born 1965), former Norwegian footballer
Kåre Jonsborg (1912–1977), Norwegian painter and textile artist
Kåre Kivijärvi (1938–1991), Norwegian photographer
Kåre Kristiansen (1920–2005), Norwegian politician for the Christian People's Party
Kåre Lunden (1930–2013), Norwegian historian
Kåre Martin Hansen (1913–1985), Norwegian politician for the Labour Party
Kåre Nordstoga (born 1954), Norwegian organist
Kåre Olafsen (1920–1945), Norwegian resistance member, executed during the Nazi occupation of Norway
Kåre Olav-Berg (1944–2007), Norwegian Nordic skier
Kåre Prytz (1926–1994), Norwegian journalist and novelist
Kåre Rønnes (born 1938), Norwegian former football player and coach
Kåre Rønning (1929–1990), Norwegian politician for the Centre Party
Kåre Schultz (born 1961), Danish business executive
Kåre Stokkeland (1918–1985), Norwegian politician for the Labour Party
Kåre Valebrokk (1940–2013), Norwegian journalist
Kåre Verpe (born 1949), Norwegian information worker and journalist
Kåre Christoffer Vestrheim (born 1969), Norwegian record producer
Kåre Willoch (1928–2021), Norwegian politician from the Conservative Party

Middle name
Stein Kåre Kristiansen (born 1951), Norwegian journalist
Walter Kåre Tjønndal (1923–2014), Norwegian politician for the Labour Party

Kaare
Kaare Aksnes (born 1938), professor at the Institute for Theoretical Astrophysics at the University of Oslo
Kaare Andrews, comic book writer and artist and filmmaker born in Canada
Kaare Bache (1888–1978), Norwegian triple jumper
Kaare Engstad (1906–1981), Canadian cross country skier
Kaare Fostervoll (1891–1981), Norwegian politician for the Labour Party
Kaare Klint (1888–1954), Danish architect and furniture designer
Kaare Kroppan (1933–2014), Norwegian actor
Kaare Meland (1915–2002), Norwegian politician for the Conservative Party
Kaare Norge (born 1963), Danish classical guitarist
Kaare Sparby (1904–2001), Norwegian politician for the Conservative Party
Kaare Steel Groos (1917–1994), Norwegian politician for the Conservative Party
Kaare Strøm (limnologist) (1902–1967), Norwegian limnologist
Kaare Sundby (1905–1945), Norwegian engineer who was executed during the Nazi occupation of Norway
Kaare Vedvik (born 1994), Norwegian-American football player
Kaare Walberg (1912–1988), Norwegian ski jumper

Other
Kaare, Estonia, village in Lääne-Nigula Parish, Lääne County, Estonia

Norwegian masculine given names